Five Nights at Freddy's is a 2014 point-and-click survival horror video game developed and published by Scott Cawthon. The game takes place in a fictional family pizzeria called "Freddy Fazbear's Pizza", where the player takes the role of a security guard who must defend themselves from the restaurant's animatronic characters that become mobile and homicidal at night.

Cawthon conceived the idea of the game after receiving criticism of his previous game, Chipper & Sons Lumber Co., for its unintentionally frightening characters that had animatronic-like movement. Developed in six months using the Clickteam Fusion 2.5 game engine, Five Nights at Freddy's was released for PC in August 2014 on Desura and Steam. The game was later made available on iOS, Android, Windows Phone, Nintendo Switch, PlayStation 4 and Xbox One.

Upon release, the game received generally positive reviews from critics, with praise for its originality, simplicity, and atmosphere, quickly gaining a cult following. It was the top-selling game on Desura for the week ending August 18, 2014, and became the subject of numerous popular "Let's Play" YouTube videos, primarily from YouTuber Markiplier. The game's success led to the launch of a media franchise, including several sequels, spin-offs, books, and merchandise, with its popularity making it subject to numerous imitations and fangames.

A film adaptation, produced by Blumhouse Productions and starring Josh Hutcherson as Mike Schmidt,  and Matthew Lillard as William Afton, is in production.

Gameplay

Five Nights at Freddy's is a survival horror video game with point-and-click elements.

The player, alone in an office, is given access to a network of security camera feeds that provide views of various parts of the restaurant. These feeds are used to track the movement of the mobile animatronics throughout the night. Each animatronic character has distinct movement patterns, and most of this movement takes place off-screen. The camera feeds are poorly lit and grainy, and one security camera, located in the kitchen, only provides an audio feed. The cameras do not cover certain areas of the building, most notably the two hallways directly to the left and right of the player, which require checking by lights that the player can control by clicking a button located adjacent to each door in their office. The player cannot leave the office, and must close the office doors for self-defense, achieved by clicking buttons adjacent to each door.

Use of these mechanics consume the player's limited electrical power; if all the power is exhausted, the cameras become inoperable, the doors open and the lights go out. The restaurant's main animatronic, Freddy Fazbear, will subsequently appear in the left doorway with flashing lights in his eyes while a music box rendition of "Toreador March" plays. After a random amount of time, the office will go pitch black and Freddy will jumpscare the player, resulting in the game ending, unless the player makes it to 6 a.m. before this occurs. If the player is jumpscared by any of the animatronics, they will be sent to the main menu and must restart from the beginning of the night.

The game has five levels comprising five "nights" in the game, each increasing in difficulty. Finishing the main game unlocks a higher difficulty sixth night, the completion of which subsequently opens up a seventh "custom night" during which the player can adjust the AI difficulty of the animatronic characters. In the game's most difficult challenge, all animatronics are set to their highest level of 20.

Plot
The player controls Mike Schmidt, who has signed up for position as a night security officer at a family pizza restaurant called "Freddy Fazbear's Pizza". A voicemail message from Mike's predecessor nicknamed "Phone Guy", plays each night, in which the employee tells Mike about different aspects of the history of the restaurant. Phone Guy explains that the restaurant's four animatronic characters – the titular Freddy Fazbear, Bonnie, Chica and Foxy – become mobile at night due to their servomotors locking up if they are left off for too long. He warns Mike that if one of the animatronics encounters a human after hours, it will mistake them for an animatronic endoskeleton without a costume and will stuff them into a spare mechanical Freddy Fazbear costume, killing the person in the process.

Throughout gameplay, the player is indirectly told about disturbing incidents that occurred in the restaurant's history. A voice message mentions "The Bite of '87", an incident which is implied to have led to the loss of a person's frontal lobe and forced animatronic mobility during the day to be prohibited. Newspaper clippings in the restaurant's east hallway reveal that a murder was reported to have occurred on-site, where a man had lured five children into a back room and apparently killed them. Later, the restaurant received complaints that the animatronics began to emit foul odors while blood and mucus leaked from their eyes and mouths, suggesting that the children's corpses were stuffed inside the animatronics. After the fourth night, Phone Guy is implied to have been killed by one of the animatronics while recording the fourth message. A voice message still plays on the fifth night, but it only consists of a garbling sound. Upon completing the fifth and sixth nights, Mike receives paychecks, but is fired once the seventh "custom night" is completed.

Development and release
Scott Cawthon created Five Nights at Freddy's after receiving negative reviews towards his previous game, the construction and management game Chipper & Sons Lumber Co. Players commented that characters in the game were unsettling and animatronic-like in appearance, with reviewer Jim Sterling calling the game unintentionally "terrifying". Although initially discouraged by this poor reception, Cawthon, who had previously mainly developed Christian-oriented games, eventually used it to inspire himself to make something intentionally scarier. Cawthon developed the game in six months using the Clickteam Fusion 2.5 game engine, and used Autodesk 3ds Max to model the 3D graphics.

Five Nights at Freddy's was first released for PC via Desura on August 8, 2014. On August 18, it was also released via Steam. A port for Android was released on August 25, 2014, on the Google Play Store, and on September 11, 2014, an iOS port was released on the App Store. A Windows Phone version was published on December 5, 2014, and in 2019, ports were released for Nintendo Switch, PlayStation 4 and Xbox One.

Reception

Five Nights at Freddy's received "generally favorable" reviews according to review aggregator website Metacritic. Indie Game Magazine praised the game for its simple take on the horror genre, labelling the game a "fantastic example of how cleverness in design and subtlety can be used to make an experience terrifying". They noted that its artistic direction and gameplay mechanics contributed to a feeling of "brutal tension", but criticized it for taking too long to load when launched.

Omri Petitte for PC Gamer gave Five Nights at Freddy's a score of 80 out of 100, commenting that the game took a "less-is-more" approach to its design, and praising the overall atmosphere for emphasizing the fear and suspense of an approaching threat, rather than the arrival of the threat itself as in other horror-oriented games. However, the gameplay was criticized for becoming repetitive once a player masters it, noting players have "not much more to expect beyond managing battery life and careful timing of slamming doors shut." Ryan Bates of GameRevolution gave the game a 9 out of 10, commending the game's minimalistic presentation (particularly its audio design and lack of music) for contributing to the terror of the game, along with its repetitive gameplay that would "[reach] almost OCD-type levels, adding to the tense environment." He opined that the game was "horror done right", but felt it was too short. Shaun Musgrave of TouchArcade gave a rating of 3.5 out of 5, noting the game's reliance on atmosphere to induce fear, opining that "if the atmosphere doesn't get to you, all that's left is a very simple game of red light-green light." Eurogamer Jeffrey Matulef called the game "wonderfully creative", and compared the animatronic animals in the game to Weeping Angels due to their ability to only move when they are not being observed.

Legacy

Upon release, Five Nights at Freddy's became immensely popular and gained a cult-following. It was the top-selling game on Desura for the week ending August 18, 2014, and largely gained popularity due to its inclusion in several popular "Let's Play" videos that were uploaded to YouTube. This success led to the development of the Five Nights at Freddy's video game series and media franchise, beginning with the release of Five Nights at Freddy's 2 in November 2014. Other than video games, the franchise has expanded to include several written works. The first of these, Five Nights at Freddy's: The Silver Eyes, was published in 2015. The game has also been subject to numerous imitations and fangames, and merchandise has been produced by companies such as Funko and McFarlane Toys.

Film adaptation

In 2017, Blumhouse Productions acquired the rights to make a film adaptation of the game. Filming began in 2023, with Josh Hutcherson as Mike Schmidt, and Matthew Lillard as William Afton.

References

External links

 
 Five Nights at Freddy's on IndieDB

2014 video games
Android (operating system) games
 
Indie video games
IOS games
2010s horror video games
Point-and-click adventure games
Video games about robots
Single-player video games
Steam Greenlight games
Works about missing people
Video games adapted into novels
Video games developed in the United States
Windows games
Windows Phone games
Nintendo Switch games
Clickteam Fusion games
PlayStation 4 games
Xbox One games